Verona Airport may refer to:

 Verona Airport, also known as Verona Villafranca Airport, Valerio Catullo, in Verona, Italy (IATA: VRN)
 Verona Airport (Wisconsin) in Verona, Wisconsin, United States (FAA: W19)
 Brescia Airport, sometimes advertised as Verona Airport, in Brescia, Italy (IATA: VBS)